Guadalupe is a Spanish-language telenovela produced by the United States-based television network, Telemundo, in conjunction with Capitalvision International Corp. and Televisión Española (TVE), from 1993, starring Adela Noriega and Eduardo Yáñez.

Summary 
Ezequiel Zambrano is a powerful businessman from Miami who has a love affair with his maid and leaves her pregnant. In fear that her boss is going to force her to do an abortion, she runs away and when her child is born she names her Guadalupe. Guadalupe's mother dies when giving birth and the child is raised by another family, without knowing who her real father is. Guadalupe grows up into a beautiful young lady of good sentiments and high hopes: to find her real family and the man of her dreams.

The family of Alfredo, the Mendoza's, was killed when he was a little boy. Only his aunt Olivia and him survived the massacre. When they discover that the murders were ordered by the Zambrano family with the purpose of getting a hold of their family's fortune, they make an oath to destroy all the members of the Zambrano family. Twenty years later, Alfredo now a successful lawyer, under a false identity, manages to become the assistant of the cold and ambitious Luisa Zambrano, sister of Ezequiel Zambrano. Luisa is the person that actually ordered the murders of the family Mendoza and of her own brother, Ezequiel.

Cast

External links

1993 telenovelas
1993 American television series debuts
1994 American television series endings
Telemundo telenovelas
Televisión Española telenovelas
Spanish-language American telenovelas
American television series based on Venezuelan television series